Marid Castle (or Marid balance) is a historic military fortress located in the city of Dumat Al-Jandal in the Al-Jawf region, about 50 km away from Sakaka. It dates back to the first century AD, and the oldest mention of it dates back to the third century AD when the Queen Zenobia (240 - 274) invaded Dumat al-Jandal and Tayma, and she could not storm the fortress. Therefore, she said: “ Marid has rebelled, and Ablaq has glorified.”

Location & Etymology 
The castle is located on a hill height of approximately 620 meters above sea level, and overlooks the city of Dumat al-Jandal, which is affiliated to the Al-Jawf region from the western side. That contributed to its fortification force as the view of the castle can oversee all parts of the town and see the one coming from long distances. The castle of Marid was named for its rebellion and insurrection against those trying to storm it, as Yaqout al-Hamwi mentioned.

Historical background 

Zenobia tried to invade Adumato in the 3rd century. When she left the castle without storming it, she said her famous saying Marid has rebelled, and Ablaq has glorified.".

In 633 CE, Khalid ibn al-Walid annexed Dumat Al-Jandal the newly formed Islamic empire.

In 1853, Talal Ibn Rashid ( Hail’s governor) damaged the castle with two cannons. In 1909, Nawwaf Ibn Sha'lan besieged it for ten months until he could wrest it from the Rashids.

The Description and Excavation of The Castle 
The castle is originally rectangular but now oval in shape, and it can be accessed from two main entrances, one in the south of the castle and the other in the north next to the tower. It is two floors; the first was built by stone, whereas the upper was built by mud. There also are four conical towers with height of 12 meter, and they were created at various times. Inside the castle, there are two wells, and its floors contain rooms for guards, shooting and observation. The castle is surrounded by a large wall of stone with many openings for observation. The fence has two entrances, one from the south and the other from the north. Visitors need about 30 minutes to go to the top of the castle due to its 1000 steps twisted stair.

Excavations at Marid Castle - inside and outside the castle - have proven that the castle dates back to the Nabataean period;  the excavations resulted in the presence of archaeological layers and pottery fragmentation dating back to the Nabataean era, along with a number of archeological discoveries and findings dating to the Nabataean era, namely:

 The foundations of the huge Marid Castle.

 Nabatean archaeological layers in different parts of the Dumat Al-Jandal

 A group of mass Nabataean cemeteries in a site called (Sanaymiyat) located to the west of Dumat al-Jandal

 Remains of the wall of Marid Castle.

In 1976, excavations revealed Nabati and Roman ceramics dating back to the first and second centuries AD. An excavation team completed the excavation east of the castle and the wall.

Excavations made by Khaleel Ibrahim Al-Moaqil in 1986 added to observations made in 1976 that a homogeneous layer of Roman-Nabataean pottery sherds indicated a prosperous community during the time of the Nabataeans to whose realm the region probably belonged.

Some parts of the castle were rebuilt between 1416 AH and 1423 AH. In addition to a mosque restoration project that includes parts of the Al-Daraa neighborhood, which included installing stone buildings, restoring cracks in the facades, entrance, and corridors, and installing wooden ceilings of taramax stems in the corridors and layers of moisture insulation

In 2018, The Saudi Commission for Tourism and National Heritage (SCTH) has launched a project to repair the castle. In the framework of the project, a cafe and a traditional restaurant have been built in the castle.

Near Antiques 
Near the castle, there are many ancient Antiques, mainly Omar ibn Al-Khattab mosque, Old Dumat Al-Jandal market,  historical neighborhood of Al-Dara’a, and the city wall.

Gallery

See also 

 Tourism in Saudi Arabia

References 

   Al-Jawf, the fortified North Castle, Abdul Rahman Al-Tayeb Al-Ansari, Dar Al-Qawafel for Publishing and Distribution, Riyadh, 1429 AH / 2008AD.

   Al-Jouf and Hussain Al-Khalifa  Nawaf Al-Rashed, Pavilion of Al-Jouf Emirate, the 18th National Festival of Heritage and Culture, 1423 AH / 2003 AD.

   Research in the effects of Al-Jouf region, Khalil Ibrahim Al-Moaqil, Abdul Rahman Charitable Foundation, Al-Jouf, 1st floor, 1422 AH.

Archaeological sites in Saudi Arabia
Forts in Saudi Arabia

Castles in Saudi Arabia